Gulella claustralis is a species of very small air-breathing land snail, terrestrial pulmonate gastropod mollusk in the family Streptaxidae.

This species  is endemic to South Africa.  Its natural habitat is subtropical or tropical moist lowland forests. It is threatened by habitat loss.

References 

Endemic fauna of South Africa
Gulella
Gastropods described in 1939
Taxonomy articles created by Polbot